Lloyd Lee Choi is a Canadian film director and screenwriter. He is most noted for his 2022 short film Same Old, which premiered in the short film competition at the 2022 Cannes Film Festival, and received an honorable mention from the Best Canadian Short Film jury at the 2022 Toronto International Film Festival.

Originally from Ottawa, Ontario, Choi had planned to study aerospace engineering at university, but changed his mind and moved to Vancouver, British Columbia to study filmmaking. In 2015 he joined Variable, a New York City-based filmmaking collective.

He has also directed the short films Foxtrot (2013), 40 Love (2014), Wanderlust (2015), Before Mars (2016) and Closing Dynasty (2022), and has worked in advertising as a director of television commercials. He received a Western Canadian Music Award nomination for Video Director of the Year in 2018 for "Closer", a single by Winnipeg indie pop band Mise en Scene.

In 2022 he was named a recipient of the Future Gold Film Fellowship, a Netflix-sponsored program to produce short films by Asian and Pacific Islander directors.

References

External links

21st-century Canadian screenwriters
21st-century Canadian male writers
Canadian male screenwriters
Canadian writers of Asian descent
Canadian people of Korean descent
Film directors from Ottawa
Writers from Ottawa
Asian-Canadian filmmakers
Living people
Year of birth missing (living people)